David Rubin (born 1956/1957) is an American casting director who was president of the Academy of Motion Picture Arts and Sciences from 2019 to 2022. He has worked on films such as The English Patient, Hairspray, and Four Weddings and a Funeral; his television credits include Big Little Lies and Sharp Objects.

Rubin grew up in Great Neck, New York, and graduated from Amherst College in 1978. He began his career working on Saturday Night Live. In 2002, he received the Hoyt Bowers Award, a career achievement prize from the Casting Society of America. He has been nominated for eight Primetime Emmy Awards and won twice: for Outstanding Casting For A Miniseries, Movie Or A Special in 2012 for Game Change, and for Outstanding Casting for a Limited Series, Movie, or Special in 2017 for the first season of Big Little Lies.

In August 2019, Rubin was elected president of the Academy of Motion Picture Arts and Sciences, becoming the organization's first openly gay president. He was re-elected in 2020 and 2021, though he was not eligible to seek a fourth consecutive term in 2022, due to term limits that included his time as a member of the board of governors.

Producer Janet Yang was elected as Rubin's successor in August 2022, becoming the first person of Asian descent to serve as president of the Academy.

References

External links 

 

Year of birth missing (living people)
1950s births
20th-century LGBT people
21st-century LGBT people
American casting directors
Amherst College alumni
Gay men
Living people
LGBT people from New York (state)
People from Great Neck, New York
Presidents of the Academy of Motion Picture Arts and Sciences
Primetime Emmy Award winners